Cryptandra filiformis is a species of flowering plant in the family Rhamnaceae and is endemic to north Queensland. It is a shrub with narrowly elliptic to narrowly lance-shaped leaves and white to creamy-white, tube-shaped flowers.

Description
Both surfaces of the leaves are covered with star-shaped hairs and the edges of the leaves are turned down or rolled under. The flowers are borne in groups of two to eleven and lack bracts. The petals protrude  beyond the sepal tube, and form a hood over the stamens.

Taxonomy and naming
Cryptandra filiformis was first formally described in 2004 by Anthony Bean in the journal Austrobaileya from specimens collected near the road between Mount Carbine and Maytown in 2002. The specific epithet (filiformis) means "thread-like", referring to the stipules.

Distribution and habitat

References

filiformis
Rosales of Australia
Flora of Queensland
Plants described in 2004
Taxa named by Anthony Bean